5380 Sprigg, provisional designation , is a background asteroid from the middle regions of the asteroid belt, approximately  in diameter. It was discovered on 7 May 1991, by Australian astronomer Robert McNaught at Siding Spring Observatory in New South Wales, Australia. It was named after Australian geologist Reg Sprigg.

Orbit and classification 

Sprigg is a non-family asteroid from the main belt's background population. It orbits the Sun in the central asteroid belt at a distance of 2.0–3.1 AU once every 4 years and 2 months (1,513 days). Its orbit has an eccentricity of 0.21 and an inclination of 9° with respect to the ecliptic. A first precovery was taken at Palomar Observatory in 1980, extending the body's observation arc by 11 years prior to its official discovery observation at Siding Spring.

Naming 

This minor planet was named after Reg Sprigg (1919–1994), Australian exploration geologist, oceanographer, biologist, author and conservationist. In 1946, he discovered the pre-Cambrian Ediacara biota, an assemblage of some of the most ancient animal fossils known. He is also the founder of the Arkaroola Wilderness Sanctuary which also hosts a small observatory. The naming was proposed by astronomer Duncan Steel. Naming citation was prepared by the Sprigg family and published on 11 April 1998.

Physical characteristics 

Sprigg has been classified as an X-type asteroid by Pan-STARRS photometric survey.

Rotation period 

A rotational lightcurve of Sprigg was obtained from photometric observations by astronomer Maurice Clark at Texas Tech University in October 2013. Lightcurve analysis gave a rotation period of 3.219 hours with a brightness amplitude of 0.68 magnitude, indicating that the body has a non-spheroidal shape.

Diameter and albedo 

According to the survey carried out by NASA's Wide-field Infrared Survey Explorer with its subsequent NEOWISE mission, Sprigg measures 6.606 kilometers in diameter and its surface has an albedo of 0.280, while the Collaborative Asteroid Lightcurve Link assumes a standard albedo for carbonaceous asteroids of 0.057 and calculates a larger diameter of 12.75 kilometers with an absolute magnitude of 13.2.

References

External links 
 Asteroid Lightcurve Database (LCDB), query form (info )
 Dictionary of Minor Planet Names, Google books
 Asteroids and comets rotation curves, CdR – Observatoire de Genève, Raoul Behrend
 Discovery Circumstances: Numbered Minor Planets (5001)-(10000) – Minor Planet Center
 
 

005380
Discoveries by Robert H. McNaught
Named minor planets
19910507